The Wanpi World Safari Zoo is a zoo in Sanqing Village, Syuejia District, Tainan, Taiwan.

History
The zoo was established in 1994 for tourism, research, conservation, entertainment and education.

Attractions
There are over 300 animals kept at the zoo, in which it has the largest amphibious reptile collections in the world with more than 200 species. It also features some endangered animals. The zoo includes the following features:
 Animal show
 Camel riding area
 Komodo dragon area

Careness
In 2021, it has been reported that 4 giraffes died in the last decade. Animal rights group advocates stopping animal import until the environment is well considered.

Transportation
The zoo is accessible by taxi from Xinying Station of Taiwan Railways.

See also
 List of tourist attractions in Taiwan

References

External links
  

1994 establishments in Taiwan
Zoos established in 1994
Buildings and structures in Tainan
Tourist attractions in Tainan
Zoos in Taiwan